The Men's 100 metre backstroke competition of the 2018 European Aquatics Championships was held on 5 and 6 August 2018.

Records
Prior to the competition, the existing world and championship records were as follows.

Results

Heats
The heats were started on 5 August at 09:56.

Semifinals
The semifinals were started on 5 August at 17:31.

Semifinal 1

Semifinal 2

Final
The final was started on 6 August at 17:07.

References

Men's 100 metre backstroke